Princess Charlotte of Schaumburg-Lippe (10 October 1864 – 16 July 1946) was Queen of Württemberg from 6 October 1891 to 30 November 1918 as the second wife and consort of King William II. She was the daughter of Prince William of Schaumburg-Lippe and Princess Bathildis of Anhalt-Dessau. Charlotte was not only the last queen of Württemberg, but the last surviving queen of any German state.

Biography

Early life
Charlotte was born in Schloss Ratiborschitz, Bohemia (now Ratibořice, Česká Skalice, Czech Republic), and grew up on the princely estate at Náchod. Besides general cultural interests such as music and art she was also very keen on sporting pursuits such as swimming, tennis, cycling and - unusual for a woman of the time - skiing. She also had an extraordinary passion for hunting.

Marriage
On 8 April 1886 she married the heir to the throne of the Kingdom of Württemberg, Crown Prince Wilhelm, who succeeded in 1891 as King William II of Württemberg (Wilhelm II. von Württemberg). She was his second wife, and like her predecessor Princess Marie of Waldeck and Pyrmont was held to be of no political consequence. If the marriage had taken place for reasons of state - Wilhelm had no male heir - it was a miscalculation, as Charlotte produced no children.

As a princess of Württemberg she lived initially in Ludwigsburg and Stuttgart, but as queen in the Wilhelmspalais in Stuttgart. From June to October the royal couple moved to their residence at Friedrichshafen. Finally in November/December Wilhelm and Charlotte regularly took a two-week hunting holiday in Schloss Bebenhausen (the former Bebenhausen Abbey) at Bebenhausen near Tübingen, which after the revolution of 1918 became Charlotte's permanent home.

In 1890, William brought his new wife to England, where the Princess May of Teck commented, "We liked Charlotte very much, she is a good honest soul tho' rather too brusque, she seems to get on well with all the members of the Württemberg family which denotes great tact".

Queen of Württemberg
King Wilhelm II enjoyed great popularity among his contemporaries, but Queen Charlotte's relationship with the people of Württemberg was by contrast very reserved, as appears from publications of the time in which a distinct enthusiasm towards the king is matched by an equally apparent coolness towards the queen. Her childlessness doubtless contributed to this, but by itself is not a sufficient explanation.

The principal reason appears to lie in Charlotte's perceived reluctance to carry out her public and ceremonial duties as it was felt she should have done. For example, she preferred to celebrate her birthdays in the privacy of Friedrichshafen rather than in visible togetherness with her subjects. She left the king mostly on his own to oversee military parades, and after a few years no longer accompanied him in the public celebration of the Kaiser's birthday. She was also not thought regal enough for her new position; the Grand Duchess of Mecklenburg-Strelitz commented in 1892, "I heard ...that she is too jolly & off-hand for a Queen, and so ugly besides". The Grand Duchess' sister the Duchess of Teck liked Charlotte, but believed she took no trouble with her clothes or appearance. This contrasted sharply with her husband, who was known as a cultivated and distinguished man of aesthetic tastes.

Charlotte nevertheless displayed an interest in and openness towards some social causes, mostly to do with the benefit of women. As convention demanded, she took over from her predecessor the patronage of a large number of social and charitable organisations, among them the body of deaconesses (Diakonissenwesen), the Swabian Women's Union (Schwäbische Frauenverein), the Württemberg Savings Bank (Württembergische Sparkasse) and the Red Cross. Among these her interest was most noticeably engaged by those to  do in some way with women's causes. She was not of course personally involved in the women's movement as such, but did demonstrate a willingness to further institutions that in various ways improved the lot and social position of women, lending her royal authority above all to support establishments that provided education and training to enable girls to be independent and to provide for themselves through their work. She showed a particular involvement as patron of the Württemberg Union of Women Painters (Württembergische Malerinnenverein) and the first humanistic Gymnasium for girls  in Württemberg, the Charlottengymnasium in Stuttgart (today the Hölderlingymnasium).

Her support of the Malerinnenverein connects to her interest in art and culture. Together with her husband she was active in the country's cultural life and often went to the theatre and the opera.

After the November Revolution of 1918 and the abolition of the monarchy, Wilhelm II agreed with the State of Württemberg for himself and his wife an annual income and right of residence for life in Schloss Bebenhausen, where after Wilhelm's death in 1921, Charlotte led a secluded life, under the title of Duchess of Württemberg (Herzogin zu Württemberg), for another quarter of a century. In 1944 she suffered a stroke which forced her for the last years of her life to use a wheelchair.

Queen Charlotte died at Bebenhausen on 16 July 1946 aged 82. She was not only the last Queen of Württemberg but the last surviving queen of any German state: the Queen of Bavaria had died in 1919, and the Queen of Prussia in 1921. She was buried, almost unnoticed, on 23 July 1946, in the Alter Friedhof in Ludwigsburg next to her husband.

Ancestry

References

Sources
 Lorenz, Mertens, Press (eds.), 1997: Das Haus Württemberg. Ein biographisches Lexikon, p. 335. Stuttgart; Kohlhammer Verlag 
 Decker-Hauff, H, 1997: Frauen im Hause Württemberg, p. 276.  DRW-Verlag: Leinfelden-Echterdingen 

 Thomsen, S., 2006: Die württembergischen Königinnen: Charlotte Mathilde, Katharina, Pauline, Olga, Charlotte - ihr Leben und Wirken. Tübingen

|-

|-

1864 births
1946 deaths
People from Česká Skalice
House of Lippe
Princesses of Schaumburg-Lippe
Princesses of Württemberg
Queens consort of Württemberg
Crown Princesses of Württemberg
Burials at Alter Friedhof, Ludwigsburg